Newport West is one of two parliamentary constituencies for the city of Newport, South Wales, in the House of Commons of the Parliament of the United Kingdom. It elects one Member of Parliament (MP) using the first-past-the-post voting system. Paul Flynn, of the Labour Party, was the MP from the 1987 general election until his death on 17 February 2019. Consequently, a by-election was held in the constituency on Thursday 4 April 2019. It is currently represented by Ruth Jones.

Boundaries

The constituency comprises the electoral divisions of Allt-yr-yn, Bettws, Caerleon, Gaer, Graig, Malpas, Marshfield, Pillgwenlly, Rogerstone, Shaftesbury, Stow Hill and Tredegar Park in the city of Newport. The western and northern boundaries are formed by the city boundary, the eastern boundary by the River Usk, and the southern boundary by the Bristol Channel.

History
Newport West was created when the former Newport constituency was split into two seats in 1983. The seat was won on a narrow three-figure majority by the Conservatives. However, Labour's Paul Flynn gained the seat in 1987 and held it until his death in 2019.

Members of Parliament

Elections

Elections in the 1980s

Elections in the 1990s

Elections in the 2000s

Elections in the 2010s

Of the 82 rejected ballots:
47 were either unmarked or it was uncertain who the vote was for.
29 voted for more than one candidate.
4 had writing or mark by which the voter could be identified.

Of the 100 rejected ballots:
69 were either unmarked or it was uncertain who the vote was for.
23 voted for more than one candidate.
8 had writing or mark by which the voter could be identified.

Of the 130 rejected ballots:
98 were either unmarked or it was uncertain who the vote was for.
29 voted for more than one candidate.
3 had writing or mark by which the voter could be identified.

See also
 Newport West (Senedd constituency)
 List of parliamentary constituencies in Gwent
 List of parliamentary constituencies in Wales

References

External links
Politics Resources (Election results from 1922 onwards)
Electoral Calculus (Election results from 1955 onwards)
2017 Election House Of Commons Library 2017 Election report
A Vision Of Britain Through Time (Constituency elector numbers)

Parliamentary constituencies in South Wales
Politics of Newport, Wales
Constituencies of the Parliament of the United Kingdom established in 1983